"When the Shit Goes Down" ("When the Ship Goes Down" on edited versions) is a song by American hip hop group Cypress Hill. The song was released as the second single from the group's second studio album, Black Sunday. The single was released exclusively in Australia and Europe.

Track listing
European 12"

European promo single

European maxi single

Australian maxi single

Charts

In popular culture
 The song was used in the 2001 film Bully.
 An edited version of the song was used in the 2007 film Freedom Writers.
 The song was used in the pilot episode of Hello Ladies.
 The song was featured in the 2013 film This Is the End.
 The song was used in a second-season episode of The Affair.
 The song was featured in the 2018 film Mid90s.
 The song was used in the episode "Ezekiel Patrol" of the 2019 TV series Doom Patrol.
The song was used in the 2019 film Guns Akimbo.

References

1993 songs
1993 singles
Cypress Hill songs
Ruffhouse Records singles
Columbia Records singles
Hardcore hip hop songs
Songs written by DJ Muggs
Songs written by B-Real
Song recordings produced by DJ Muggs